Gaitani is a village in the southern part of the island of Zakynthos. It is part of the municipal unit of Zakynthos.  In 2011 its population was 1,899. It is 2 km west of Zakynthos city centre, and 2 km east of Vanato. In the Middle Ages, during the Venetian rule many, mainly small, churches were built in the  Gaitani area but most of them collapsed because of the big 1953 Ionian earthquake or because of the ravages of time. There are more than 70 ruins of churches at the area.

Population

See also

List of settlements in Zakynthos

External links
Gaitani at the GTP Travel Pages

References

Populated places in Zakynthos